Hanstedt is a municipality in the district of Harburg, in Lower Saxony, Germany. It is situated approximately 35 km south of Hamburg, and 25 km west of Lüneburg.

Hanstedt is also the seat of the Samtgemeinde ("collective municipality") Hanstedt.

References

Harburg (district)